The Oklahoma Sooners women's gymnastics team represents the University of Oklahoma in NCAA competition and competes in the Big 12 Conference. The Sooners have won thirteen Big 12 titles, 7 NCAA Regional championships, and have appeared in 15 NCAA National Championships. In 2014, the Sooners won the program's first-ever team national title in the first-ever NCAA gymnastics championships tie, tying with Florida with a score of 198.175. The Sooners have had five individual national champions, 86 NCAA All-Americans, and two Honda Awards (both to Kelly Garrison).

History
The Sooners gymnastics team was founded in 1981 under head coach Paul Ziert, who led the Sooners to three regional championships and two NCAA tournament appearances. The Sooners won their first five conference titles beginning in 1984 under coach Becky Switzer. Steve Nunno added another Big 12 title in 2004.

Current head coach K. J. Kindler took over the program before the 2007 season; the Sooners qualified to their first Super Six team final in 2010, finishing 2nd. In 2014, Oklahoma became the sixth school to win an NCAA gymnastics team title (following Alabama, Utah, Georgia, UCLA and Florida). The 2014 Super Six final was the first to end in a tie, giving Oklahoma their first title and Florida their second straight.

Super Six appearances

Four on the Floor appearances

Championships

National championships

Conference championships

Roster

2022–23 Roster

Coaches 
Head coach: K. J. Kindler
Assistant coach: Lou Ball
Assistant coach: Tom Hale

Past Olympians 
 Kelly Garrison (1988)
 Chelle Stack (1988)
 Ragan Smith (2016 alternate)

See also 
 Oklahoma Sooners men's gymnastics

References